The Saffron Building Society is a regional building society which has branches and agencies in the East of England. These span: Essex, Hertfordshire and Suffolk. It is a member of the Building Societies Association.

History
Saffron Building Society was established in 1849. It is a UK building society based in Saffron Walden, Essex.

It began life as the Saffron Walden Second Building Society and was founded by the Revd John Marten, who became the first Secretary. The first Chairman of the Saffron Building Society was a local builder called Joseph Durrant. Originally established as a 'terminating society' Saffron Walden Second Building Society became a permanent building society in 1857 and changed their name to The Saffron Walden Second Benefit Building and Investment Society on the Permanent Plan. In the same year the Society lent £1,730.

In 1873 Henry Hart a printer, was chairman and directors' salaries now stood at £1.

 1866 - 1905 Fitzroy Ackland, a local solicitor was Secretary.
 1900 assets stood at £37,000.
 1905 William Freeman, Ackland's Clerk became Secretary. During this time the role becomes a full-time job.
 1930 purchases its own premises for the first time.
 1935 Edward Hughes Freeman (William's son) becomes Secretary. He died in 1947.
 1947 Philip Sidney Kettieridge becomes Secretary and holds this post for 23 years.
 1948 assets reached £300,000.
 1959 assets reached £1,000,000.
 1968 takes over The Saffron Walden and Essex Mechanics Permanent Building Society.
 1969 the first branch office is opened in Haverhill.
 1972 takes over the Royston & District Building Society and becomes the Saffron Walden & District Building Society.
 1978 assets reached £21,000,000 with four offices.
 1979 merges with London and Essex Building Society (previously North Bow & Manor Park) and becomes the Saffron Walden & Essex Building Society.
 1984 opens in new premises on the old Cattle Market site in Saffron Walden.
 1989 merges with the Herts & Essex Building Society based in Bishop's Stortford and becomes the Saffron Walden, Herts & Essex Building Society.
 2006 changes its name to Saffron Building Society.
2019 closes branches in Sawbridgeworth, Great Dunmow and Frinton, reducing network to eight branches in Bishop's Stortford, Brentwood, Colchester, Halstead, Haverhill, Royston, Saffron Walden and Ware.

References

External links
Saffron Building Society
Building Societies Association
KPMG Building Societies Database 2008

Saffron Walden
Building societies of England
Banks established in 1849
Organizations established in 1849
Companies based in Essex
1849 establishments in England